Sheraz Daya is a British ophthalmologist. Daya founded the Centre for Sight in 1996, and works in stem-cell research and sight recovery surgery.

Education
Daya graduated from the Royal College of Surgeons in Ireland in 1984. Following this, he interned at the Royal Victoria Hospital, Belfast and from 1985 to 1988 he was a resident in internal medicine at the NY Downtown Hospital in New York. He later specialized in Ophthalmology in New York and a Fellowship in Cornea, Keratorefractive and Anterior Segment Surgery at the University of Minneapolis, Minnesota.

Career
Daya began his career in New York City, where he served as director of cornea and external disease at the Catholic Medical Centre. In 1993, Daya became the director and consultant ophthalmic surgeon of the Corneo Plastic Unit and Eye Bank at the Queen Victoria Hospital NHS Trust in East Grinstead.  In 1995 Daya was one of the first ophthalmologists to perform LASIK eye surgery in the UK. In 1996 Daya founded the Centre for Sight, where he serves as director, which opened in 1996. He has also worked in the fields of anterior segment and keratorefractive surgery, and the use of femtosecond laser during cataract surgery in the NHS.

Daya has also used stem cell treatment during corneal transplant surgeries, and was the world's first person to perform live corneal transplantation with a femtosecond laser in 2006. The technique was shown in the documentary film The Science of Seeing Again. In 2009 Daya delivered the Choyce Medal lecture to the United Kingdom & Ireland Society of Cataract & Refractive Surgeons. Daya has also been interviewed regarding other trends in ophthalmology and methods of sight restoration. In 2017 Daya was shown in a BBC documentary providing advice on how laser eye surgery is supposed to be performed.

Publications
Daya has served as co-Medical Editor of the journal Cataract & Refractive Surgery Today Europe. He has also been published in the journal Ophthalmology, as well as in the journals Cornea, the British Journal of Ophthalmology, and the Journal of Cataract & Refractive Surgery. Daya has also been published in the Journal of American Association for Pediatric Ophthalmology and Strabismus and Transactions of the American Ophthalmological Society.

Recognition
In 2008 Daya received the Leadership for Improvement award from the National Health Service's South East Coast Best of Health and Health and Social Care Awards Then in 2009, Daya received the Senior Achievement Award from the American Academy of Ophthalmology and the Choyce Medal from the United Kingdom & Ireland Society of Cataract & Refractive Surgeons. In 2018 Daya was awarded the Fyodorov medal by the Hellenic Society of Intraocular Implant and Refractive Surgery.

References

Living people
British ophthalmologists
British Muslims
British Ismailis
People educated at Bloxham School
Alumni of the Royal College of Surgeons in Ireland
Year of birth missing (living people)